Youth College is a member of VTC Group which offers an interactive learning environment for youths above Secondary 3 to acquire knowledge and skills for further studies and employment. It was established in 2004.

Campuses 

There are eight Youth College campuses:
 Kowloon Bay (Kowloon Bay Training Centre Complex)
 Kwai Chung (Kwai Chung Training Centre Complex)
 Pokfulam (Pokfulam Training Centre Complex)
 Kwai Fong (Relocated to Ha Kwai Chung Government Secondary School building in 2010. Located in Council of the Church of Christ Yenching College at So Uk Estate from 2004 to 2010)
 Tuen Mun (Share campus with IVE (Tuen Mun))
 Tseung Kwan O (Relocated to Grantham College of Education Past Students' Association Tseung Kwan O Primary School in 2009
 Yeo Chei Man (located in the former Yeo Chei Man Senior Secondary School)
 Tin Shui Wai (located in the former ho Ming Primary School)

Programme 
Full-time programme provided by Youth College:

The Diploma of Vocational Education Programme

Full-time Post-secondary 6 Programme
Students who have completed Secondary 6 under the New Senior Secondary (NSS) Academic Structure are eligible for admission to this programme.

Full-time Post-secondary 3 Programme 
Students who have completed Secondary 3 are eligible for admission to this programme.

Furthermore, part-time programme provides long life learning opportunities for those who want to further study. Students can choose to take relevant modules according to their need of personal development. After accumulating certain amount of credit values, student can achieve different levels of qualifications. Therefore, students can attain higher level of qualification through a flexible progression pathways based on their own learning progress.

Stream (Academic)

Scope of "Business and Services"
Business
Beauty Care
Fitness and Sports Studies

Scope of “Engineering” 
 Computer-aided Product Engineering
 Mechanical Engineering
 Digital Electronics Technology
 Building Services Engineering
 Automotive Technology
 Aircraft Maintenance
 Electrical Engineering
 Construction
 Watch and Clock

Scope of "Design and Technology" 
 Print Media 
 Fashion Textile Design and Merchandising
 Jewellery Arts & Design
 Information Technology

External links 

 Youth College (VTC)
 Youth College @ Youtube
 Vocational Development Programmes

Schools in Hong Kong
2004 establishments in Hong Kong